Katie West is a Yindjibarndi Western Australian interdisciplinary artist, exhibiting multi-sensory installations. Her exhibitions often feature dyed textiles and native plants, sewn and woven. She documents the processes of her work as a form of storytelling.  West grew up in Badgingarra, a town on Noongar country, and is of Yindjibarndi descent.

Awards 
West won the Falls Creek Resort Indigenous Art Award and Dominik Mersch Gallery Award in 2017. She was chosen as a participant in the Kickstart program in 2015 and exhibited at the Next Wave Festival in 2016.

References

External links 
  – includes a list of her exhibitions.

Artists from Western Australia
Australian women artists
Living people
Year of birth missing (living people)
Indigenous Australians from Western Australia